Javan Azadi Kabul F.C. is a football team based in Afghanistan. They competed in the Afghan Premier League, currently playing in Kabul Premier League.

External links
 https://web.archive.org/web/20110812030740/http://azadifc.co.uk/index.html

Football clubs in Afghanistan
Sport in Kabul
2003 establishments in Afghanistan
Association football clubs established in 2003